Abdul Sesay (born 30 September 1991) is a Sierra Leonean footballer who plays as a forward for TP-47.

International career

International goals
Scores and results list Sierra Leone's goal tally first.

References

External links 
 
 

1991 births
Living people
Sierra Leonean footballers
Association football midfielders
Sierra Leonean expatriate footballers
Sierra Leone international footballers
Atlantis FC players
OFK Titograd players
Oulun Palloseura players
Expatriate footballers in Finland
Expatriate footballers in Montenegro
Sportspeople from Freetown
TP-47 players
JS Hercules players